Dugald Galbraith was a Scottish footballer who played for Sheffield United. Signed in 1889 having played local football in Dundee he stayed with the Bramall Lane club for just their inaugural season which consisted mainly of friendly fixtures. He played seven games for the Blades in the FA Cup and scored the team's first ever FA Cup goal against Scarborough in September 1889.

References

Association football forwards
Scottish footballers
Sheffield United F.C. players
Year of birth missing
Place of birth missing
19th-century Scottish people